Scheisse or Scheiße may refer to:

 "Scheisse", 1981 song by Ebba Grön
 "Scheiße" (song), by Lady Gaga

See also 
 Shit (disambiguation)